"All the Gold in California" is a song written by Larry Gatlin, and recorded by American country music group Larry Gatlin & the Gatlin Brothers Band.  It was released in August 1979 as the first single from the album Straight Ahead.  The song was the first of two number one singles for Larry Gatlin & the Gatlin Brothers Band.  The single stayed at number one for two weeks and spent a total of ten weeks on the chart.

Content
This song was written while Larry was in a traffic jam in Los Angeles; the song goes on to warn the listener that all the gold in the state "is in a bank in the middle of Beverly Hills in somebody else's name" and that attempting to make it big in California carries a risk of failure that could personally devastate one's resolve.  On January 19, 1985, Larry Gatlin & the Gatlin Brothers Band sang the song at the nationally televised 50th Presidential Inaugural Gala, the day before the second inauguration of Ronald Reagan.

Chart performance

References

1979 singles
1979 songs
Larry Gatlin songs
Songs about Los Angeles
Columbia Records singles
Songs written by Larry Gatlin